Charne Griesel (born 20 July 2000) is an South African judoka. She won the bronze medal in Judo at the 2022 Commonwealth Games – Women's 52 kg.

References

2000 births
Living people
South African female judoka
Commonwealth Games bronze medallists for South Africa
Commonwealth Games medallists in judo
Judoka at the 2022 Commonwealth Games
21st-century South African women
Medallists at the 2022 Commonwealth Games